Pierre Gendron (born Leon Pierre Gendron, March 4, 1896 – November 27, 1956) was an American actor and screenwriter. He was married to screenwriter Mary Alice Scully.

Partial filmography as actor

The World and His Wife (1920) (as Leon Gendron)
The Girl with the Jazz Heart (1921) (as Leon Guerre Gendron)
Scrambled Wives (1921) (as Leon P. Gendron)
If Women Only Knew (1921) (as Leon Gendron)
The Bashful Suitor (1921)
The Young Painter (1922)
The Man Who Played God (1922)
Outlaws of the Sea (1923)
Does It Pay? (1923)
Broadway Broke (1923)
Just Off Broadway (1924)
Blue Water (1924)
The City That Never Sleeps (1924)
Three Women (1924)
The Dangerous Flirt (1924)
The Lover of Camille (1924)
What Price Beauty? (1925)
The Scarlet Honeymoon (1925)
The Enchanted Island (1927)

Partial filmography as screenwriter

Brooding Eyes (1926)
Sal of Singapore (1928)
The Monster Maker (1944)
Minstrel Man (1944)
Bluebeard (1944)
Fog Island (1945)

External links

1896 births
1956 deaths
American male film actors
American male silent film actors
20th-century American male actors